Kurosawa's Way is a 2011 French documentary directed and written by Catherine Cadou. The film features 11 major filmmakers from Asia, America and Europe as they discuss how the films of Japanese director Akira Kurosawa influenced them.

Synopsis
Kurosawa's Way is a documentary that is intercut with Catherine Cadou's narration on her own experiences with Kurosawa, and interviews with various directors and archival photographs. The directors' interviews focus on both philosophical and technical observations of Kurosawa's films.

Interviewees
 Bernardo Bertolucci
 Julie Taymor
 Theo Angelopoulos
 Alejandro González Iñárritu
 Abbas Kiarostami
 Shin'ya Tsukamoto
 Hayao Miyazaki
 John Woo
 Martin Scorsese
 Clint Eastwood
 Bong Joon-ho

Release
The film was shown at the 2011 Cannes Film Festival and the 24th Tokyo International Film Festival. The documentary was released on the Blu-ray and DVD by the Criterion Collection as part of their release of Kurosawa's film Dreams.

Reception
Variety praised the film, referring to it as "Meticulously crafted" and "engrossing".

Notes

External links
 

French documentary films
Akira Kurosawa
2011 documentary films
2011 films
Documentary films about film directors and producers
Documentary films about Japan
Japan in non-Japanese culture
2010s French films